Gove Saulsbury (May 29, 1815 – July 31, 1881) was an American physician and politician from Dover, in Kent County, Delaware. He was a member of the Democratic Party, and he served in the Delaware General Assembly and as Governor of Delaware. He led opposition to civil rights for African Americans in Delaware.

Early life and family
Saulsbury was born in Mispillion Hundred, Kent County, Delaware, son of William and Margaret Ann Smith Saulsbury. His father was a descendant of the Salusbury Family of Wales, but changed the spelling of the name after the American Revolution due to his family's loyalist sympathies. He was the older brother of U.S. Senators Willard Saulsbury, Sr., and Eli M. Saulsbury and the uncle of U.S. Senator Willard Saulsbury, Jr. Gove Saulsbury attended Delaware College in Newark and graduated from the University of Pennsylvania Medical School in 1842. He married Rosina Jane Smith and had five children: Margaret, Olivia Smith, Rosa, Gove, and William. Saulsbury was a medical doctor and lived at the northwest corner of the Green in Dover. He and his family were members of the Methodist Church. Saulsbury's choice of religious denomination sparked some controversy within the family as both of his brothers were staunch Episcopalians. In 1861 he was President of the Delaware Medical Society.

Professional and political career
Saulsbury was elected to the Delaware State Senate and served in the 1863/64 and 1865/66 sessions. He was the Speaker in the 1865/66 session and succeeded to the office of Governor of Delaware on the death of Governor William Cannon on March 1, 1865. Defeating James Riddle of New Castle County, he was elected to a full term in his own right in 1866, and continued in office until January 17, 1871. He was a delegate to the Democratic National Convention in 1876.

With Saulsbury as governor, the Democratic Party took full control in Delaware. Strongly opposed to the Thirteenth, Fourteenth, and Fifteenth Amendments to the U.S. Constitution, Saulsbury and the Democrats took every possible step to frustrate their implementation and deny the new rights given to African-Americans. This included the recommendation that African-Americans convicted of certain crimes be sold back into slavery. This fear-mongering was so successful that no Republicans were elected to the Delaware General Assembly in 1868, and hardly any were elected for many years thereafter.

When Saulsbury's term was over, he wanted to assume the U.S. Senate seat held by his brother, Willard Saulsbury. Willard had compromised himself with a well-known drinking problem, and many wanted him replaced. Unfortunately for Gove Saulsbury, the third brother, Eli M. Saulsbury also wanted the seat. After much balloting in the General Assembly, it became apparent to Willard that he could not win, so he switched his votes to Eli, who consequently won. Gove Saulsbury returned to his medical practice full-time.

Death and legacy
Saulsbury died at Dover and is buried there in the Old Methodist or Whatcoat Cemetery. He was President of the Delaware Medical Society in 1861, and in 1873 was one of the founders of Wesley College in Dover.

He was a strong and effective leader for a bitterly reactionary majority in Delaware, and his policies set the tone and the agenda for much political activity for a generation. According to Scharf, Saulsbury had "a deep sense of personal responsibility. He had a strong will and asserted his opinions earnestly and often, and as it seemed to those who differed with him, obstinately." Governor Robert J. Reynolds described him as "distinguished for his cunning. He was the slyest, cunningest man, and the most natural born politician Delaware ever produced." He was said to have "never apologized, compromised, or surrendered, unless it was in his interest."

Almanac
Elections are held the first Tuesday after November 1. Members of the Delaware General Assembly took office the first Tuesday of January. State senators have a four-year term. The governor takes office the third Tuesday of January and has a four-year term.

References

Images
Hall of Governors Portrait Gallery Portrait courtesy of Historical and Cultural Affairs, Dover

External links
Biographical Directory of the Governors of the United States
Delaware’s Governors

The Political Graveyard

Places with more information
Delaware Historical Society; website; 505 North Market Street, Wilmington, Delaware 19801; (302) 655-7161
University of Delaware; Library website; 181 South College Avenue, Newark, Delaware 19717; (302) 831-2965

1815 births
1881 deaths
Democratic Party governors of Delaware
Democratic Party Delaware state senators
Physicians from Delaware
Methodists from Delaware
People from Dover, Delaware
Burials in Dover, Delaware
Wesley College (Delaware)
Union (American Civil War) state governors
Saulsbury family
19th-century American politicians